The Valais Youth Cup was a two-day international football tournament that featured four teams. It was played at the Complexe Sportif du Bout du Lac in Le Bouveret, Switzerland.

Teams
In February 2013, FIFA gave Kosovo permission to play games against FIFA members' youth teams. This competition saw Kosovo compete in their first officially recognised fixture when they played Ghana, on 14 June 2013. The tournament was used to prepare Egypt and Ghana for the 2013 FIFA U-20 World Cup competition.

Squads

Kosovo

Coach:  Rafet Prekazi

Competition format

Matches

Semi-finals

Third place play-off

Final

References

External links
 Official website

2012–13 in Ghanaian football
2012–13 in Egyptian football
2012–13 in Kosovan football
2013 in Brazilian football
2013